The bare-eyed antbird (Rhegmatorhina gymnops), occasionally known as the Santarem antbird, is a species of insectivorous passerine bird in the antbird family, Thamnophilidae. It is endemic to Brazil. Its natural habitat is subtropical or tropical moist lowland forests.

The bare-eyed antbird was formally described by the American ornithologist Robert Ridgway in 1888 and given the binomial name Rhegmatorhina gymnops.

This species is a specialist ant-follower that depends upon swarms of army ants to flush insects and other arthropods out of the leaf litter.

References

bare-eyed antbird
Birds of the Brazilian Amazon
Endemic birds of Brazil
bare-eyed antbird
Taxa named by Robert Ridgway
Taxonomy articles created by Polbot